George Sfougaras (born 1959) is a contemporary British Greek artist, based in Leicester, England; he works and exhibits internationally, in collaboration with a network of partners. He claims that his work is concerned with memory, identity, and the impact of history on the present, and that his printed works explore issues of human migration, change and cultural inheritance through representational art which draws on cultural symbols and archival research. He is a member of the Leicester Society of Artists and the Leicester Print Workshop. In 2017, he established the Focus on Identity International collective, a group of artists from various European and Middle Eastern countries.

Early life and artistic themes 
Sfougaras was born in Heraklion, Crete, to Christian parents who were refugees from Asia Minor (modern Turkey) and who subsequently came to the UK during the 1970s military Junta period; he says that these narratives form the cornerstone of his work. His mother’s accounts of the transportation and loss of the island’s Jewish population inspired the book Tales from an Old Fort Town: a personal response to the Jewish History of Crete, and an exhibition at Etz Hayyim Synagogue in Crete, in 2018. George was invited on a residency to Chania in March 2019, to create a map of the former Jewish area of the city, incorporating the long-destroyed Neve Shalom, Chania’s second synagogue. His two subsequent installations for the Leicester Museum and Art Gallery deal with the horrors of war and forced migration. In 2021, in The Light in the Darkness exhibition in Leicester, Sfougaras presented two United Nations-style rescue tents, within which large transparencies of Jewish, Turkish, Greek, and Armenian refugees were illuminated by a rotating black box, simultaneously illuminating, and "retelling" the past. He later created a multi-site installation entitled In Remembrance in the form of a film which depicts the turning pages of a large book containing extracts from two of his publications, Tales from an Old Fort Town and One Winter’s Night in Prague.

Career and works 
Sfougaras worked in the education sector. In 2014, while he was headteacher of the Children's Hospital School in Leicester, he led the school in the collaborative Learning at Home and the Hospital (LeHo) project, in partnership with hospital schools in six other countries. Here he also contributed to a project led by the University of Leicester on Mind, Body, Spirit: How museums impact health and wellbeing.

In Sfougaras' 2019 Arts Council-funded exhibition under the title of Recovered Histories, in partnership with the National Portrait Gallery, the Leicester Print Workshop, Leicester Museums, and ArtReach, he presented mixed media works, including banners, drawings, animated panels and prints based on his family’s experience of displacement and resettlement, making a connection with the on-going turmoil of global migration. The works were exhibited in the Leicester Cathedral and the Portsmouth Cathedral and in Leicester’s LCB Depot and other public spaces.  For some of his prints, he worked closely with refugees and asylum seekers. For example, he worked with the Roots Group of refugees and asylum seekers in Leicester to create an exhibition in response to the concept of ‘Coming Home’ centred around the loan from the National Portrait Gallery of the Richard III portrait to Leicester, the place of the discovery of his remains and his eventual interment.

Sfougaras’s reinterpretation of the Knight, Death and the Devil by Dürer was purchased by Leicester Museums Trust in 2020 to be housed within the German Expressionist Gallery: he claims that the large pen and ink drawing focuses on the symbolism of the work, how elements have been subverted by political interests and superimposes new elements alluding to recent European history.

Exhibitions and related works

References

External links 

 George Sfougaras' Website
 Focus on Identity International Website

English contemporary artists

1959 births
Living people
Artists from Heraklion